Elections to Lambeth London Borough Council were held on 4 May 2006.  The whole council was up for election with no boundary changes since the last election in 2002.  The Labour party gained control of the council, replacing the Liberal Democrat and Conservative coalition that had run the council since the previous election.

The election was notable for the Labour Party managing to win control of the borough despite a marginal fall in its overall percentage share of the vote. Labour taking Lambeth was also against the trend of the 2006 local election body elections which saw Labour lose control of 18 councils with a loss of 319 councillors.

Also significant was the election of Lambeth's first Green Party councillor, one of many gains for the Party across London. The Green Party took 16% of the vote across the borough.

Election result

|}

Ward results
* - Existing Councillor seeking re-election.

Bishop's

Brixton Hill

Clapham Common

Clapham Town

Coldharbour

Ferndale

Gipsy Hill

Herne Hill

Knight's Hill

Larkhall

Oval

Prince's

St Leonard's

Stockwell

Streatham Hill

Streatham South

Streatham Wells

Thornton

Thurlow Park

Tulse Hill

Vassall

External links
 Lambeth Council website - official results page

2006
2006 London Borough council elections
21st century in the London Borough of Lambeth